"Nothing Left" is a single by Norwegian DJ and record producer Kygo, and features vocals from British singer Will Heard. The song was first played at a live show in Chicago held in partnership with Uber. Users of Uber's mobile app could book a free ride to the secret concert where the song was premiered. "Nothing Left" was commercially released on 31 July 2015. No music video was made for it.

Track listing

Charts

Certifications

References

2015 singles
2015 songs
Kygo songs
Will Heard songs
Song recordings produced by Kygo
Songs written by Kygo
Songs written by Will Heard
Sony Music singles
Number-one singles in Norway